Wayne Anderson may refer to:

 Wayne D. Anderson (1930–2013), American college basketball coach
 Wayne Anderson (politician) (born 1953 or 1954), Canadian politician in Alberta
 Wayne Anderson (racing driver) (born 1968), American race car driver
 Wayne Anderson (swimmer) (born 1945), American former swimmer

See also
 Wayne Andersen (born 1945), former United States federal judge